St. Philomena's Church or St. Philomena Catholic Church may refer to:

in India
 St. Philomena's Church, Mysore, India

in the United States
(by state)
 Saint Philomena Catholic Church in Honolulu, Hawaii
 St. Philomena Catholic Church - Kalawao, Hawaii
 St. Philomena Catholic Church - Peoria, Illinois
 St. Philomena's Church - Labadieville, Louisiana
 St. Philomena Catholic Church - Detroit
 St. Philomena's Cathedral and Rectory, Omaha, Nebraska, listed on the NRHP in Nebraska
 St. Philomena Catholic Church - Livingston, New Jersey
 St. Philomena's Church (Cincinnati, Ohio)
 St. Philomena's Church (Pittsburgh)
 St. Philomena Catholic Church - Des Moines, Iowa
 St. Philomena's Roman Catholic Church, Franklinville, New York